Florencio Collazo Gómez (born 1 March 1964) is a Mexican politician affiliated with the Institutional Revolutionary Party. As of 2014 he served as Deputy of the LIX Legislature of the Mexican Congress representing Chiapas.

References

1964 births
Living people
Politicians from Chiapas
Institutional Revolutionary Party politicians
Autonomous University of Chiapas alumni
21st-century Mexican politicians
Deputies of the LIX Legislature of Mexico
Members of the Chamber of Deputies (Mexico) for Chiapas